Jenkins is a surname that originated in Cornwall, but came to be popular in southern Wales. The name "Jenkin" originally meant "little John" or "son of John". The "kin" portion is of Dutch or Danish origin (-kijn), which then gained a certain popularity in England.

History

As a forename
John, followed by kin/ken meaning 'little', gave Jenkin or Jenken. The first use of the name "Jenkins" or "Jenkens"  in England occurred as early as 1086 as a diminutive of the English form of John. It was often translated (a loan word) from the Flemish/French as "John the younger" or seen as "John Jenken" and incorrectly, but frequently referred to as "Little John". The non-diminutive Jehan/Jehannes (pronounced "Jo-han/Jon-han-es") was also translated into English as John. When Jen/Jean and Jehan/Jehannes is seen, it is not reflective of birth order. Jehan/Jehannes is listed as "John the elder" in English, but never translated or seen as "Big John".

In early English history, confusion can arise when the sire is listed as John, a son is John (the elder) and another son is John (the younger). At that time, it was a direct reference to the name John in the formal and diminutive forms and not associated with birth order. Today, the term "John, Senior" is sometimes used for the father, distinguishing him from "John, Junior" or a numeric designation (e.g., "II"). "Jon" the phonetic of John is sometimes seen but only in males as is the diminutive nickname of "Johnny."  The French male name "Jean", formerly pronounced "Jon", has not been common in English usage as a male name, but has been associated as a female name (pronounced as Gene) since the 16th century. For more information see: Jean#Limburgish

As a surname
Jenkins is a surname variant of Jenkin commonly seen in Cornish and in English (mainly Devon) ancestry. Its translation is "Little John" or, more literally, "John the little." Its earliest documented occurrence was in Monmouthshire, in the Domesday Book of 1086, but it almost certainly predates the Norman Conquest.

A common English use, leading to use as a surname, may have been the now-obsolete "little Johns",  a 12th-century term for the Cornish (and later Welsh) people, either alluding to their comparatively small stature or, more likely, classing them as illegitimate offspring of the unpopular King John of England, who was previously the Earl of Cornwall and Gloucester.

A Welsh form of the name is Siencyn. "Jenkin" or "Jenkins" and variants should not be construed as shortened forms of "Jenkinson", which denotes "the son of little John."

Spelling variations
Variations of the name Jenkins have included:

Jenkins
Jenkin
Jankins
Jenkynn
Jenkynns
Jenkyns
Jinkines
Jinkins
Jenken
Jenkens
Jenniskens
Junkin
Junkins
Jinkens
Siencyn – a Welsh variation – John is sometimes spelled Zhahn, Sion and Sien

See also
List of people with surname Jenkins
Jenkin
Jenkyns
Little John

References

English-language surnames
Patronymic surnames
Surnames from given names